The 2001 Queensland state election was held on 17 February 2001.

Retiring members

Labor
 Paul Braddy MLA (Kedron)
 David Hamill MLA (Ipswich)

National
 Russell Cooper MLA (Crows Nest)
 Tony Elliott MLA (Cunningham) 
 Brian Littleproud MLA (Western Downs)
 Len Stephan MLA (Gympie)

Independent
 Jim Elder MLA (Capalaba) — elected as Labor
 Mike Kaiser MLA (Woodridge) — elected as Labor
 Grant Musgrove MLA (Springwood) — elected as Labor

Legislative Assembly

Sitting members are shown in bold text. Successful candidates are highlighted in the relevant colour. Where there is possible confusion, an asterisk (*) is also used.

See also
 Members of the Queensland Legislative Assembly, 1998–2001
 Members of the Queensland Legislative Assembly, 2001–2004
 2001 Queensland state election

References

Psephos: Adam Carr's Election Archive — Queensland 2001

Candidates for Queensland state elections